Prejmer is a commune in Brașov County, Transylvania, Romania. It is composed of three villages: Lunca Câlnicului (Farkasvágó), Prejmer, and Stupinii Prejmerului (Rohrau; Méheskert).

At the 2011 census, 90.7% of inhabitants were Romanians, 6.3% Roma, 1.9% Hungarians and 0.8% Germans.

History

The Teutonic Knights constructed the fortress Tartlau in 1212–1213 as part of their colonization of the Burzenland region. The town of Prejmer near the castle had begun development by 1225, and was the easternmost settlement of the Transylvanian Saxons. Prejmer was repeatedly invaded throughout the Middle Ages by various groups, including the Mongols, Tatars, Hungarians, Ottoman Turks, Cossacks, and Moldavians. However, the castle was only captured once, by Gabriel Báthory in 1611. Most of Prejmer's German population fled the commune after the Romanian Revolution of 1989.  

Prejmer is noted for its fortified church, one of the best preserved of its kind in Eastern Europe. Between 1962–1970, the Romanian government carefully restored it to its present condition; the restoration work was done under the direction of architect Mariana Angelescu and engineer Alexandru Dobriceanu. The church is modeled after churches of Jerusalem, as well as built in the style of Late Gothic churches from the Rhineland.  In the 15th century, it was surrounded by a wall 12m high, forming a quadrilateral with rounded corners.  The wall was reinforced by four horseshoe-shaped towers, two of which have since disappeared.  The entrance—a vaulted gallery—is protected by a barbican and flanked by a lateral wall.  The defensive structure is strengthened by embrasures and bretèches, while the covered way is surrounded by a parapet. The granaries and rooms that accommodated the villagers are arranged on four levels above the cellars.

Natives
 Darie Magheru (1923–1983), Romanian poet and theatre actor
 Leonard Oprea (b. 1953), Romanian writer

Gallery

See also 
 List of castles in Romania
 Tourism in Romania
 Villages with fortified churches in Transylvania

References

Evaluations of cultural properties, at the UNESCO World Heritage Convention, Marrakesh, Morocco, November 29–December 4, 1999, pp. 177–182

External links

History of Tartlau (Prejmer) 
Aerial picture of Prejmer Fortress 
Pictures of cultural highlights in Prejmer
"Biserica Sfânta Cruce" 
Fortified church in Prejmer
"Video Fortified Church Prejmer" 

Communes in Brașov County
Localities in Transylvania
Villages with fortified churches in Transylvania
Burzenland